Inspection 12 is an American pop punk band from Jacksonville, Florida, founded by Robert Reid, Dan McLintock, John Comee and Scott Shad. They have released two full-length recordings internationally, one on Honest Don's Records and one on Suburban Home Records and Takeover Records. They have also released four full-length albums independently.

History

Teenage years
Vocalist Robert Reid, guitarist Dan McLintock, bassist John Comee and drummer Scott Shad formed The Abominable Snowmen of the Himalayas 12 in 1994 while in junior high school, influenced by the first wave of southern Californian punk rock/skate punk bands such as Lagwagon and NOFX. The band was renamed Inspection 12, inspired by a fictional band on the Nickelodeon TV show The Adventures of Pete & Pete named Inspector 12. After recording a cassette in 1995, titled Eponymous EP, the band recruited a second guitarist, Peter Mosely. Their first show for a crowd was at a friend's backyard birthday party, playing only cover by bands such as Nirvana and Green Day, with newcomer Pete joining in on the NOFX and Weezer songs.

Their first full-length album, Come, Hefe, Come! was recorded on cassette tape in 1996 and sold independently. Few copies are known to exist, but a digital copy made by a fan was uploaded to the official messageboard in 2003. Recorded live and consisting mostly of songs later re-recorded with vastly improved production values, such as "Secure" and "Bad Mentality", it could be considered a demo. Their first big show was opening for Less Than Jake.

Incorporating vocal harmonies beyond that which is considered gratuitous for most typical skate punk bands, while also sharing vocal duties on their recording, their second album Inspection 12 would be the last for founder Robert Reid as he graduated and left the band to enter college, and with bassist John Comee also leaving, guitarist Dan McLintock soon took up the bass and lead vocalist roles. Released in 1997 on compact disc, it was their first recording with sound quality on the level of a professional demo. Another album, You're A Nation, was released in 1998, and James Trimble, cousin to Scott Shad, was added as second guitarist to replace the departed founder Robert Reid. Their fourth full-length album, Step Into The Fire, was released in 1999 with the new lineup. On this recording, drummer Scott Shad's best friend Ryan Key performed additional vocals on the song "Nothing to Lose". While still in high school, they sold more than 2,500 copies of their independently recorded and produced CDs locally and opened for bands such as Strung Out, Millencolin and Bigwig. Although being a relatively successful local band, Mosely recalls feeling like outcasts because of their preppy clothes and unorthodox style of punk rock, explaining that "Whenever we'd play a show like Good Riddance or AFI, it would always be a real tough crowd. I used to hear it all the time about us being rich kids."

Graduation
Upon graduating high school in 1999, Dan McLintock left for Santa Cruz, California together with Ryan Key to audition for two newly vacated guitarist spots in the Tooth & Nail band Craig's Brother. They were both successful, and Inspection 12 were left without their lead vocalist and frontman. After recording Lost at Sea in 2000, Dan left Craig's Brother and briefly joined Limp, out on tour, where at a show in Las Vegas, Nevada a copy of Inspection 12's latest album Step Into The Fire was handed to Fat Wreck Chords label owner Fat Mike by Limp's tour manager. Dan was asked to produce a newer recording to be considered for Fat Wreck Chords subsidiary Honest Don's Records, so he returned home to Jacksonville and rejoined Inspection 12 to record an EP. James was away in Tennessee at the time and temporarily unable to play live shows. Ryan Key had left Craig's Brother a year before Dan and joined Yellowcard, so he was asked to play bass while Dan covered the guitars for performances. After the release of the Home EP, Inspection 12 signed on with Honest Don's and entered the studio in December to record their fifth album and record label debut, In Recovery. By now, James was back as a guitarist, and Yellowcard violinist Sean Mackin was asked to record the string sections, along with Ataris cellist Angus Cooke. Joey Cape from Lagwagon and Bad Astronaut also made a brief appearance, singing a few lines on the song "Red Letter Day".

On March 6, 2001, awaiting the release of Inspection 12's debut album, eighteen-year-old drummer Scott Shad was killed in a car accident. His death devastated the members of the band, who for a while considered disbanding. Scott's best friend Ryan playing with Yellowcard was also traumatized by this experience, and both bands would keep writing songs and paying tribute to Scott's memory throughout their careers. Instead of auditioning for a new drummer, Dan's best friend since pre-school Tim Grisnik was signed on as the new drummer, and in May, In Recovery was released on Honest Don's, in memory of Scott Shad.

James left the band after their 2002 In Recovery U.S. tour and returned to college, and the band returned to the studio as a three-piece  to record their second album for Honest Don's, Get Rad. However, after eight months of recording songs, which were distinctly less typical for punk rock than their previous recordings, more slowly paced and prominently featuring many other instruments than the core bass, guitar and drums, Honest Don's president reportedly told them "My label doesn't put out this kind of music. And I don't even know what to call it." They were dropped from the record label and bought their recorded material back to finish the album themselves. Pete Mosely was simultaneously assisting Yellowcard with writing and recording bass guitar for their Capitol Records debut Ocean Avenue, and shortly after left Inspection 12 to join them as their permanent bassist. After closing a new recording deal with European label Floppy Cow Records, the album was finished, with guest vocals performed by Ryan Key as well as Ted Bond, lead singer of recently disbanded Craig's Brother. It was released by Floppy Cow in 2004 in Europe and Japan, along a distribution deal with Suburban Home Records to sell it in the U.S. The distribution rights for the album were later transferred to Yellowcard guitarist Ben Harper's label Takeover Records when the band was signed to the label in 2005.

Recent history
After the release of Get Rad, Dan McLintock also decided to return to school. Not breaking up or going on hiatus, Inspection 12 remained, although only playing sporadic shows in the member's home area of Jacksonville as they focused on their lives outside of music. James would later rejoin the band in July 2006 after finishing his studies, and after Yellowcard's 2007 release Paper Walls, Pete Mosely would also return. He describes the current situation of the band as "We just toned it down and it's more of just a hobby for us". In November 2012 Dan McLintock announced on the band's official Facebook page that he had decided to leave the band. Rob Reid, founding member and original singer rejoined soon thereafter.

Inspection 12 announced on their Facebook page on May 20 of 2013 that they are in the process of recording a new record, the first single of which "Ole You" was released on Amplified Vol. 1, a compilation CD of local Jacksonville artists. The band would go on to release its latest album, Redefine, in December 2014.

Side projects
In 2004, following the release of Get Rad after being dropped by Honest Don's, Dan McLintock and Tim Grisnik started the band Sensei alongside Inspection 12, together with long-time friends Damion Waters, Mark O'Quinn and Eric Denton. After playing shows for a few years, Sensei dissolved in May 2007. Tim Grisnik is also a founding member of The Softer Side, which formed in 1999.

In September 2008, Dan McLintock, Tim Grisnik and Eric Denton joined forces with Casey Teate to form The John Carver Band and have recorded two full-length albums (The John Carver Band 2008 & Everywhere is Home 2012) and one EP (Innocent Strategies 2017).

Music style and influences
The band started off as an unorthodox band, described as preppy compared to the more stereotypical punk rockers, eventually incorporating more and more instruments into their sound, often layering a piano over the guitars which has been described as "sacrilege" to the punk community.

Apart from the southern Californian punk rock/skate punk bands such as NOFX and Lagwagon, members of Inspection 12 have expressed their admiration for musicians such as The Beatles, Ben Folds, Billy Joel, Bruce Hornsby, Cat Stevens, dada, Death Cab for Cutie, Elton John, James Taylor, Mötley Crüe, Sting and Tom Petty as well as classical composers such as Ludwig van Beethoven, Johann Sebastian Bach, Frédéric Chopin, Wolfgang Amadeus Mozart, George Frideric Handel and Sergei Rachmaninoff.

Band members
Current members
 Rob Reid – lead vocals, guitar (1994–1997, 2013–present)
 Pete Mosely – piano, backing vocals, guitar (1995–2003, 2007–present), bass (2012–2014)
 James Trimble – guitar, backing vocals (1998–2002, 2006–present)
 Jeremy Baker – bass (2014–present)
 Tim Grisnik – drums, percussion (2001–present)

Former members
 John Comee – bass (1994–1997)
 Dan McLintock – lead vocals, bass (1997–2012), guitar (1994–1997, 2000 in studio, 2003–2006), backing vocals (1994–1997)
 Scott Shad – drums, percussion (1994–2001; died 2001)

Session members
 Ryan Key – bass (2000)

Timeline

Discography

Albums
Come, Hefe, Come! (1996)
Inspection 12 (1997)
You're A Nation (1998)
Step Into the Fire (1999)
In Recovery (2001)
Get Rad (2003)
Redefine (2014)

EPs
Home (2000)

Demos
Eponymous EP (1995)

Compilation appearances
Floyd ...And Out Come The Teeth, Fat Wreck Chords, contributed "Red Letter Day" (2001)
The Beginning of the End, End Records, contributed "Secret Identity" (2001)
Honest Don's Dirty Dishes, Honest Don's Records, contributed "Secret Identity"  (2001)
A Different Shade of Green: A Green Day Tribute, Skunk-Ape Records, contributed "F.O.D." (2003)

Videography
Inspection 12 DVD (2004)

References

External links

Inspection 12's MySpace page

Pop punk groups from Florida
Musical groups from Jacksonville, Florida
1994 establishments in Florida
Musical groups established in 1994